During the 2001–02 English football season, Charlton Athletic competed in the FA Premier League.

Season summary
Despite being without several key players for long periods of time due to injury, Charlton did well in their 11th season under the management of Alan Curbishley. They were in with a real chance of UEFA Cup qualification as late as March, but a failure to win any of their final eight league games dragged them down to 14th.

Dependable centre back Richard Rufus now began to suffer a series of injury setbacks, missing half of the season.

Final league table

Results summary

Results by round

Results
Charlton Athletic's score comes first

Legend

FA Premier League

FA Cup

League Cup

Players

First-team squad
Squad at end of season

Left club during season

Reserve squad

Statistics

Appearances, goals and cards
(Starting appearances + substitute appearances)

Transfers

In

Out

Transfers in:  £9,750,000
Transfers out:  £1,250,000
Total spending:  £8,500,000

Loan in

Loan out

Notes

References

Charlton Athletic F.C. seasons
Charlton Athletic